Ted Dekker (born October 24, 1962) is an American author of Christian mystery, thriller, and fantasy novels including Thr3e, Obsessed, and the Circle Series.

Biography

Dekker was born in Dutch New Guinea shortly after it had been placed under the United Nations Temporary Executive Authority before becoming a province of Indonesia. His parents, John and Helen, served as missionaries among the Dani people. Ted graduated from high school and took up permanent residence in the United States to study philosophy and religion.

In the early nineties, Dekker turned to writing novels. Over the course of three years, he wrote two full-length novels before starting from scratch and rewriting both. He moved his family to the mountains of Western Colorado and began writing full-time on his third novel. Two years and three novels later his first novel was published. To date, he has written over 30 novels and is best known for psychological thrillers and fantasy tales.

Dekker's novels have sold over 10 million copies worldwide. Two of his novels, Thr3e and House, have been made into movies. Dekker resides in the Nashville area with his wife Lee Ann and one of their daughters.

The oldest of his four children, Rachelle Dekker, is also a writer.

Awards
 2003 Christy Award Best Fiction Book forThr3e
 2003 ECPA Gold Medallion Award Best Fiction Book for Thr3e
 2010 Retailer Choice Award for Green
 2010 Audio File Earphones Award Best Audiobook for The Bride Collector
 2010 INSPYs Bloggers Award for Excellence in Faith-Driven Literature Speculative Fiction for Green
 2012 RT Reviewers Choice Award Inspirational Suspense for The Sanctuary
 2014 Christy Award Best Suspense Book for Outlaw
 2015 INSPYs Bloggers Award for Excellence in Faith-Driven Literature Mystery/Thriller for A.D. 30

Bibliography

The Books Of History Chronicles

The Circle Series
 Black: The Birth of Evil (2004)
 Red: The Heroic Rescue (2004)
 White: The Great Pursuit (2004)
 Green: The Beginning and the End (2009) (Known as "Green: The Last Stand" in The Circle 4-in-1 due to Alternate Ending)

Beyond the Circle
 The 49th Mystic (May 2018)
 Rise of the Mystics (October 2018)

The Paradise Series

 Showdown (2005)
 Saint (2007)
 Sinner (2008)

The Lost Books Series

 Chosen (2007)
 Infidel (2007)
 Renegade (2008)
 Chaos (2008)
 Lunatic (2009) with Kaci Hill
 Elyon (2009) with Kaci Hill

The Books Of Mortals Series
 The Keeper (2011) with Tosca Lee
 Forbidden (2011) with Tosca Lee
 Mortal (2012) with Tosca Lee
 Sovereign (2013) with Tosca Lee

Other Books Connected to The Books of History Chronicles
 House (2006) with Frank Peretti
 Skin (2007)
 Immanuel's Veins (2010)
 The Blood Book (2011) with Kevin Kaiser and Josh Olds
 Genesis (2011)
 To Kill With Reason (2010)

Thrillers
 Blink (2003)
 Thr3e (2003)
 Obsessed (2005)
 Blink of an Eye (2007)
 Adam (2008)
 Kiss (2009) with Erin Healy
 BoneMan's Daughters (2009)
 Burn (2010) with Erin Healy
 The Bride Collector (2010)
 The Priest's Graveyard (2011)
 The Sanctuary (2012)
 Play Dead (2021)

The Caleb Series
 Blessed Child (2001) with Bill Bright
 A Man Called Blessed (2002) with Bill Bright

The Martyr's Song Series
 Heaven's Wager (2000)
 When Heaven Weeps (2001)
 Thunder of Heaven (2002)
 The Martyr's Song (2005)

Outlaw Chronicles
 Outlaw (2013)
 Eyes Wide Open (2014)
 Water Walker (2014)
 Hacker (2014)
A.D. Series
 A.D. 30 (2014)
 A.D. 33 (2015)

Short Stories
 The Promise (2005)
 The Drummer Boy (2006)

Non-Fiction
 The Slumber of Christianity (2005)
 Tea with Hezbollah (2010) with Carl Medearis
 The Forgotten Way (2015) with Bill Vanderbrush
 The Forgotten Way Meditations (2015) with Bill Vanderbrush
 The Way of Love, Book 1 (2018)
 The Way of Love, Book 2 (2018)

The Dream Traveler's Quest 

 Book 1: Into the Book of Light (2018) with Kara Dekker
 Book 2: The Curse of Shadowman (2018) with Kara Dekker
 Book 3: The Garden and the Serpent (2018) with Kara Dekker
 Book 4: The Final Judgment (2018)  with Kara Dekker

And They Found Dragons 

 Book 1: The Boy Who Fell From the Stars (2021) with Rachelle Dekker
 Book 2: Journey to the Silver Towers (2021) with Rachelle Dekker
 Book 3: Rise of the Light Bringer (2021) with Rachelle Dekker

Millie Maven 

 Book 1: The Bronze Medallion (2020) with Rachelle Dekker
 Book 2: The Golden Vial (2020) with Rachelle Dekker
 Book 3: The White Sword (2020) with Rachelle Dekker

References

Further reading 
Squeezing the Reader's Heart by Guthrie, Stan. Christianity Today. Oct 2005, Vol. 49 Issue 10, p. 96
"Ted Dekker: Black, white and read." Fowlds, Sean. Publishers Weekly 250.37 September 15, 2003
"Ted Dekker's Life." Joshuadigangisbiggestfan.tripod.com/bio.html. Ted Dekker Fansite, 2009
"Gossip, Scandal & Things Of The Odd Best-selling Author Shaped By Cannibals, Christiantiy." http://www.mynewsletterbuilder.com/. Copyright © 2008-2009 Infinity Books Japan All Rights Reserved. This Newsletter Created Exclusively for Infinity Books Japan by Out Sourcing Pro, n. d. Web.

External links
 
 
 

1962 births
Living people
21st-century American novelists
American thriller writers
Evangel University alumni
American graphic novelists
American fantasy writers
American horror novelists
Dutch emigrants to the United States
People from Yahukimo Regency
American male novelists
21st-century American male writers
Netherlands New Guinea people